The Ridglea Theater is a single-screen theater located in Fort Worth, Texas, USA, which opened in December 1950. Its primary owner was the Interstate theater chain, and the first movie shown was Pretty Baby.  The theater is well known for its Mission/Spanish Revival facade and 70-foot stone tower. In 1990, a Dallas-based investment company acquired the theater for 1.85 million dollars, and the Maulsby trust purchased the building in 1991. The theater is currently going through a multimillion-dollar renovation.

It was added to the National Register of Historic Places on December 30, 2011.

Photo gallery

See also

National Register of Historic Places listings in Tarrant County, Texas

References

External links

Architecture in Fort Worth: Ridglea Theater

National Register of Historic Places in Fort Worth, Texas
Buildings and structures in Fort Worth, Texas